Bapujee College is an undergraduate college( & Higher Secondary) established in the year 1970 at Sarthebari of Barpeta district in Assam. The college is affiliated to Gauhati University.

Accreditation
In 2016 the college has been awarded "B" grade by National Assessment and Accreditation Council.  The college is also recognised by University Grants Commission (India).

References

External links
 

Colleges affiliated to Gauhati University
Universities and colleges in Assam
Barpeta district
1970 establishments in Assam
Educational institutions established in 1970